Thompsonville is an unincorporated community in Gonzales County, Texas. The elevation is 427 feet.

References

Unincorporated communities in Gonzales County, Texas
Unincorporated communities in Texas